What Isn’t There is a 2012 Philippine new wave film co-written and directed by Marie Jamora. The film stars Dominic Roco, Dawn Zulueta, Boboy Garovillo, Felix Roco, and Annicka Dolonius. The film was first screened as part of the 2012 Cinemalaya Philippine Independent Film Festival where it competed under the New Breed category.

Ang Nawawala won the Audience Choice and Best Original Music Score awards during the Cinemalaya competition.

Synopsis
Gibson Bonifacio stopped speaking when he was a child.

Now twenty years old, he is back in Manila for Christmas. While always festive in the Philippines, the holiday remains tinged with sadness for his family because it marks the anniversary of his twin brother’s death. Against the backdrop of the vibrant local music scene, his childhood best friend tries to reconnect with him, while he unexpectedly finds a chance at his first, real romantic relationship.

Gibson reconsiders and redefines his relationship with his family, with himself, even with the only person he talks to: his dead brother.

Cast
Dominic Roco as Gibson Bonifacio
Annicka Dolonius as Enid
Dawn Zulueta as Esme Bonifacio
Boboy Garovillo as Wes Bonifacio
Felix Roco as Jamie Bonifacio

References

External links
 
 Ang Nawawala at the Cinemalaya website

2012 films
2012 drama films
2010s Tagalog-language films
Philippine New Wave
Philippine drama films